G.E.L.F. or GELF is an acronym for genetically engineered lifeform. It was used in two science fiction television programs, originally appearing in the BBC's cult sitcom Red Dwarf, and later on in the U.S. drama seaQuest DSV.

Red Dwarf
The concept of GELFs is explored in several episodes of Red Dwarf including "Polymorph" (1989), "Camille" (1991), "Psirens" (1993), "Emohawk: Polymorph II" (1993), and "Krysis" (2016). The writers of the series had stated early on in production that they did not want any aliens to exist in their show's universe; but as the series continued, in order to provide a stream of characters for the main crew to interact with, their cosmos was gradually populated with deranged robots and bizarre creatures that turned out to be the result of genetic engineering.

Humanoid GELFs

Kinitawowi

The Kinitawowi are bulky humanoids about six feet high covered in warts and shaggy dull orange/copper/brown fur similar to that of an orangutan. Their bodies are extremely tough; a direct blast of plasma from a bazookoid merely stunned a Kinitawowi at close range.

The Kinitawowi were originally bred as quartermasters aboard deep space starships. They lead a primitive tribal existence on various moons and asteroids. Their space is bordered by gigantic stone warning beacons that resemble skulls many miles across carved out of asteroids, seen in the series VI episode "Emohawk: Polymorph II" (1993). In the episode, second technician Arnold Rimmer (Chris Barrie) recalls from old space legends that unfortunate humans that unwittingly wandered into Kinitawowi space were often skinned alive to make beanbags. Nevertheless, as the 4000 Series service mechanoid Kryten (Robert Llewellyn) explains, the Kinitawowi were one of the friendlier tribes of humanoid GELFs and that they didn't always kill on sight as other humanoid GELFs apparently do. Indeed, not skinning strangers alive on sight was considered a warm greeting.

Kinitawowi villages resemble African tribal villages, dimly-lit by flaming torches. The structures of these villages are simple huts. After a successful trade, instead of a handshake, Kinitawowi custom is to hold the ankle of the other individual with one hand whilst the other does the same; and then jumping up and down on the spot.

In "Emohawk: Polymorph II", the crew of the transport vehicle Starbug first meet the Kinitawowi when they require supplies, especially an oxygen-generation unit. The Kinitawowi have one to trade but require third technician Dave Lister (Craig Charles) to marry the chieftain's daughter (played by Steven Wickham) in exchange. A disgusted Lister marries the chief's daughter, but flees in the night. The furious chief (played by celebrity chef Ainsley Harriott), sends his Emohawk after the Red Dwarf crew to drain their emotions. The Kinitawowi pursue Starbug across space in a battle cruiser, in a bid to return Lister to his Kinatawowi wife until the Kinitawowi battle cruiser is crippled when it crashes onto an ice planet during a chase with Starbug.

Biologically Engineered Garbage Gobblers (BEGGs)
Seen in series X episode "Entangled" (2012), BEGGs were engineered to eat garbage. Much like the Kinitawowi, BEGGs are hoarders who collect artefacts they consider valuable. During a card game with Lister they win Starbug, in an attempt to win back the ship Lister bet with Rimmer, and lost. In order to assure that Lister would return with their newly won hologram the BEGGs attach an explosive device to Lister's groin which is set to explode unless he delivers Rimmer. The BEGGs have been described as "what would happen if you mangled a pig, a hobbit and a member of a 80s hair metal band." The BEGG chief was played by Steven Wickham, who had played Lister's Kinitawowi bride in series VI.

Brefewino
The Brefewino are a separate tribe of humanoid GELFs, who appeared in the "lost episode" of the seventh series, "Identity Within". They are vaguely similar in appearance to the Kinitawowi tribe except the Brefewino are taller, more muscular, hairy, mercantile and aggressive than their Kinitawowi counterparts. Brefewino tribesmen stand on average seven or eight feet high, but despite this their beards often almost reach the ground. They also weigh on average two tonnes.

They were initially bred as butchers and are prolific gamblers, merchants, and slave traders, and amongst their favourite commodities are the Felis sapiens race. The universal currency of the Brefewino is Brefewinan, a kind of green lumpy paste in jars (made from small delicately preserved pulses). In order to enter a Brefewino trading post one must show exactly what their specific profession is with a "badge of merchantship". For example, Lister wears a potato to signify he is a farmer. Brefewino gambling dens resemble a Star Wars cantina. Brefewino music utilises more traditional instruments but is still fairly raucous and their beer is exceptionally strong.

Sakken Yakko
In the series XI episode "Krysis" (2016), six gunships belonging to the Sakken Yakko tribe of GELFs attack Starbug. Starbug fails to outrun them and the GELFs disables its engines. One Sakken Yakko called Equahecte (played by Steven Wickham) prepares to, but upon realising the 3000 Series mechanoid Butler is on board, he kindly escorts Starbug to safety. Butler explains that Equahecte made Butler the godfather of Equahecte's daughter after Butler helped Equahecte's sick tribe. They speak in a different dialect to the Kinitawowi, which Kryten and the other crewmembers on Starbug find difficult to speak.

Nakki-Ninkers 
The Nakki-Ninkers, or "vampire GELFs", are described by Rimmer in the series XI episode "Can of Worms" (2016) as a GELF tribe that feasts on virgins. Kryten explains that they can tell the smell of a virgin apart from a non-virgin by the pheromone produced by fear. He says that "Only the virgins are scared, so they're the only ones producing the fear pheromone."

Pleasure GELFs

Pleasure GELFs are, in their natural form, amorphous, green slimy blobs around 1.5 metres high from the series IV episode "Camille" (1991). In this default form they have a single tentacle-like appendage with an eye on the end. At least one Pleasure GELF has resolved to finding a "cure" for its "condition".

Unlike several other genetically engineered life forms, such as the manipulative polymorphs and the aggressive beastmen-GELFs, pleasure GELFs are actually benevolent and non-threatening.  Some such as Camille attempt to pass themselves off as humans (or holograms, mechanoids, etc.) but this is generally not an attempt to be manipulative, more akin to a camouflage reflex so other species won't try to harm them (though they can voluntarily stop the telepathic projection and reveal their true form if they need to).

Pleasure GELFs are telepathic. They can sense whatever the people around them would be attracted to, and make them believe that this is what they're seeing. In "Camille", Lister, Rimmer, a humanoid Cat (played by Danny John-Jules) and Kryten see their dream partners (variously played by Suzanne Rhatigan, Francesca Folan, Judy Pascoe, and Danny John-Jules), and Camille is forced to reveal her true nature. Despite its natural form, Kryten begins dating it. Camille eventually leaves to help her partner, a Pleasure GELF named Hector (Rupert Bates), in a manner similar to Casablanca.

Emotional vampires

The Polymorph

A polymorph is a shape-shifting organism that can change into anything it pleases, seen in the series III episode "Polymorph" (1989). It survives by draining a person of a negative emotion. It is described in the episode as being designed to be the perfect warrior, blending into any background, causing confusion and disarray amongst the enemy by playing with their emotions, but the creature mutated into something terrifying and insane its creators couldn't control. One of the polymorph's forms appears somewhat similar to the Xenomorph Alien from the movie Alien (1979). Polymorphs appear to be able to drain emotions from mechanoids and holograms, and are able to physically touch soft-light holograms. A genetic mutant documentary in "Can of Worms" mentions that a female polymorph deposits a passing organism with her eggs while disguising herself as a mate. Kryten also explains that these eggs hatch soon after the host body for them is found and that polymorphs often die after this exhaustive process is complete, ending their life cycle.

The Grant Naylor novel Better Than Life (1990) provides a slightly different origin to the polymorphs. According to that book, the surviving GELFs of a great war were dumped on Earth and left to die. Most did die, except for those specifically suited to survive in such an environment. The polymorphs evolved from these organisms.

When it arrives on board the mining ship Red Dwarf in "Polymorph", the Polymorph attacks the crew by turning into a ruthless monster to drain Lister's fear, a beautiful woman to drain the Cat's ego, a duplicate of Rimmer to blame Kryten for the Cat's condition and thus extract his guilt, and Rimmer's mother after having sex with Lister to provoke Rimmer's rage. It is eventually defeated when two heat-seeking blaster bolts that the Cat had previously trapped in an elevator are released once again, the bolts destroying the Polymorph in its monster state and its death restoring the crew to normal.

In "Can of Worms", a pregnant female polymorph is unwittingly rescued from being held prisoner and is brought aboard Red Dwarf when she disguises herself as a female Felis sapien (played by Dominique Moore). After a date with the Cat, the Cat becomes the host body for her "morphling" offspring and the polymorph dies after depositing her eggs. After the Cat gives birth to the eight morphlings, Lister and the Cat kill them.

Emohawk

The "Emohawk" is a Polymorph whose natural form is something similar to a large bird or hawk. It appears in the episode "Emohawk: Polymorph II". Like all Polymorphs, the Emohawk is emotional leech - it steals emotions from other living creatures.

Emohawks are domesticated variants of Polymorphs that are spayed at birth, raised by the Kinitawowi and trained to do their bidding. Emotions drained by the Emohawks are a highly valued trading commodity amongst the Kinitawowi.

Psirens

Appearing in the series VI episode "Psirens" (1993), Psirens are GELFs which can telepathically alter the perception of humans, in order to suck out their brains with a straw. In their natural form, Psirens are insectoids standing at around two metres high and look something like giant Assassin Bugs, with giant bulbous eyes and a large carapace. Their name and manner are similar to the Sirens of Greek mythology.

GELFs in the Red Dwarf novels
The novel Last Human (1995) features several additional GELFs:

Symbi-morphs are very similar to the Pleasure Gelf, but seems to have actual shape-shifting abilities. Its neutral or "true" form is an androgynous humanoid with a black and white matrix colour scheme. It has five telepathic hooks which it can fire into someone to read their mind and shape-shift accordingly, with each additional hook making the connection more powerful. Even a single hook was enough to access the subject's subconscious; Lister is able to use a symbi-morph bonded to him with a single hook to not only determine the nature of the symbi-morphs based on information he had subconsciously put together, but also reveal the subconscious doubts he had harboured about the mission to rescue an alternate version of himself who turned out to be a homicidal sociopath.

Dingotangs are chimera-type GELFs: orangutans with the heads of dingoes. Dolochimps are chimera-type GELFs with the heads of dolphins, the bodies of chimpanzees and the legs of giant locusts. Alberogs are chimera-type GELFs with the heads of albatrosses, the bodies of bears and the legs of giant frogs. Alberogs make up most of the population of the asteroid Arranguu 12, the site of the Gelf Forum of Justice. The Regulator of Justice is an Alberog.

Snugiraffes are chimera-type GELFs with the heads of cobras, the bodies of giant slugs and the legs of giraffes, who also appear to have had a bucket of mucus thrown at them. Snugiraffes are called the most repulsive creatures ever to have lived, with the exception of George Formby — even just seeing them can trigger vomiting (or, in the case of holograms and mechanoids, dry-retching). They are still highly prized, however, because they eat everyone else's effluence and process it into a smokeless fuel. It isn't troubled by the reaction other beings have to its appearance, considering vomiting to be a form of greeting.

seaQuest DSV

When NBC decided they wanted more science fiction oriented episodes for the second season of seaQuest DSV, G.E.L.F.s were introduced to the program, primarily via Peter DeLuise's main character Dagwood.

Dagwood was the imperfect prototype "Dagger", a group of G.E.L.F.s intended as supersoldiers. Unlike the other Daggers, Dagwood was less intelligent than normal and his fighting skills were not fully developed, although he had great physical strength. He was assigned to the seaQuest cleaning crew.

In the show's canon, the G.E.L.F.s were created during the dark age of genetics (2001 to 2003). They were manufactured solely for the purpose of waging war. United Nations Resolution G-932 outlawed them by 2004. The existing G.E.L.F.s were rounded up and exiled to an island colony, "Dagger Island". The second season's opening episode Daggers established much of their background, and also introduced Mariah, the leader of the G.E.L.F. uprising. Portrayed by actress Sam Jenkins, she would reappear in the episode Dagger Redux.

References

Red Dwarf
Genetic engineering in fiction